Keti Tsatsalashvili (born 10 June 1992) is a Georgian chess player and Woman Grandmaster (WGM) since 2011.

Biography
Keti Tsatsalashvili repeatedly represented Georgia at the European Youth Chess Championships and World Youth Chess Championships in different age groups, where she won six medals: two gold (in 2007, at the World Youth Chess Championship in the U16 girls age group and in 2010, at the European Youth Chess Championship in the U18 girls age group), two silver (in 2009, at the World Youth Chess Championship in the U18 girls age group and in 2009, at the European Youth Chess Championship in the U18 girls age group) and two bronze (in 2007, at the European Youth Chess Championship in the U16 girls age group and in 2008, at the World Youth Chess Championship in the U16 girls age group).

Keti Tsatsalashvili has won multiple international chess tournaments, including in 2010, Florencio Campomanes memorial women's chess tournament in Ankara.

In 2008, she was awarded the FIDE International Woman Master (WIM) title and received the FIDE International Woman Grandmaster (WGM) title three years later.

Streaming and commentary
In early 2021, Tsatsalashvili partnered with Armenian Women's Chess Champion, WGM Maria Gevorgyan, as well as IM Zura Javakhadze, and Aram Mashigian, to start the LetsChessLive channel on the streaming platform Twitch, before deciding to start streaming on her own eponymously-named channel.  

Tsatsalashvili also regularly does commentary on chess events, both in real life and online, especially on Chess.com and for FIDÉ.

References

External links

Keti Tsatsalashvili chess games at 365Chess.com

1992 births
Sportspeople from Tbilisi
Living people
Female chess players from Georgia (country)
Chess woman grandmasters